The 1992 Cork Junior A Hurling Championship was the 95th staging of the Cork Junior A Hurling Championship since its establishment by the Cork County Board. The draw for the opening fixtures took place on 15 December 1991. The championship ran from 27 September to 1 November 1992.

The final was played on 1 November 1992 at Páirc Uí Chaoimh in Cork between Newcestown and Newtownshandrum, in what was their first ever meeting in the final. Newcestown won the match by 2-14 to 3-05 to claim their third championship title overall and a first title in 12 years.

Newcestown's Pat Kenneally was the championship's top scorer with 1-16.

Qualification

Results

Quarter-finals

 Newtownshandrum received a bye in this round.

Semi-finals

Final

Championship statistics

Top scorers

Overall

In a single game

References

1992 in hurling
Cork Junior Hurling Championship